Civil unrest and protests against the government of Iran associated with the death in police custody of Mahsa Amini began on 16 September 2022 and are ongoing as of  . Amini had been arrested by the Guidance Patrol for allegedly violating Iran's mandatory hijab law by wearing her hijab "improperly" while visiting Tehran from Saqqez. According to eyewitnesses, she had been severely beaten by Guidance Patrol officers, an assertion denied by Iranian authorities. As the protests spread from Amini's hometown of Saqqez to other cities in the Iranian Kurdistan and throughout Iran, the government responded with widespread Internet blackouts, nationwide restrictions on social media usage, tear gas and gunfire.

Although the protests have not been as deadly as those in 2019 (when more than 1,500 were killed), they have been "nationwide, spread across social classes, universities, the streets [and] schools", and called the "biggest challenge" to the government of Iran since the Islamic Revolution in 1979. At least 488 people, including 64 minors, had been killed as a result of the government's intervention in the protests, .  An estimated 19,262 have been arrested throughout at least 134 cities and towns, and at 132 universities.

Supreme Leader Ayatollah Ali Khamenei dismissed the widespread unrest not only as "riots" but also as a “hybrid war" caused by foreign states and dissidents abroad. Women, including schoolchildren, have played a key role in the demonstrations. In addition to demands for increased rights for women, the protests have demanded the overthrow of the Islamic Republic, setting them apart from previous major protest movements in Iran, which have focused on election results or economic woes. 
The government's response to the protests has been widely condemned.

Historical background 

Since shortly after the 1979 Iranian Revolution, Iranian women have been legally required to completely cover their hair in public with a hijab. Enforcement of the unpopular law was eased during the 2013–2021 tenure of President Rouhani, but was then intensified under Rouhani's successor, the hard-line President Ebrahim Raisi.  Bloody Aban , a month near November in the Iranian calendar, was a series of 2019 protests initially caused by a 50–200% increase in fuel prices, and as part of the wider Iranian Democracy Movement, leading to calls for the overthrow of the government in Iran and Supreme Leader Ali Khamenei.

These continued in 2020 and merged with the Ukraine International Airlines Flight 752 protests following the governments mistaken shooting down a passenger plan during their retaliatory Operation Martyr Soleimani.

Mahsa Amini's arrest and death in custody 

Mahsa Amini, a 22-year-old Kurdish Iranian woman, was arrested by the Guidance Patrol on 14 September 2022 because of an "improper hijab." The police were accused of beating her and inflicting a fatal head injury; Amini was pronounced dead on 16 September. After a CT scan confirmed that Amini had sustained head injuries, the head of the Guidance Patrol was allegedly suspended, a claim that was denied by Tehran police.

Protests 

Initial protests, mostly led by women, demanded an end to the mandatory hijab; these protests evolved into a national revolt. The protests became more widespread than those of 2009, 2017, and 2019, encompassing even Islamic Republic power bases such as the holy cities of Mashhad and Qom. Unlike some previous protests, the new protests involved both urban middle classes and rural working areas. In addition, schoolgirls demonstrated in numbers for the first time. While continuing to protest Amini's death and demanding an end to the mandatory hijab, Iranians also advocated for wider freedoms and women's rights, and protested against the morality police, the Ayatollah, and the theocratic regime.

Unlike many previous Iranian protests, protesters appear to be demanding a wholesale change in government rather than limiting themselves to incremental reforms. In a November 2022 Group for Analyzing and Measuring Attitudes in Iran (GAMAAN) poll, almost three-quarters of Iranians opposed mandatory hijab; of these anti-hijabis, 84% would prefer a secular Iranian state to theocracy, which GAMAAN characterized as an endorsement of regime change. According to Radio Free Europe/Radio Liberty, economic hardship and poor living conditions contributed to the growth of the protests. The New York Times itemized Iranian grievances such as "soaring prices, high unemployment, corruption, (and) political repression", and identified the poor Iranian economy as a major force behind the protests; according to an Iranian report in August 2021, a third of Iranians live in poverty. Abdolreza Davari, a conservative analyst, has quoted a statistic that 95 percent of Iranians are "worried about their livelihoods today and for their and their children's future." Only 15% of Iranians in the job market are women. Iran ranked 143rd out of 146 countries in the 2022 WEF Gender Gap Report, due in part to prohibitions on female membership in powerful government organizations.

In response to the protests, people held demonstrations in support of the government across several cities in Iran, in an attempt to counter the protests. The Iranian government referred to these counter-protests as "spontaneous". The pro-government protesters called for the anti-government protesters to be executed, and referred to them as "Israel's soldiers" whilst shouting "Death to America" and "Death to Israel", reflecting Iran's clerical rulers' usual narrative of putting the blame of the unrest on foreign countries.

Media coverage was constrained by Iranian restrictions on speech, including Internet shutdowns and arrests of journalists. NBC News retained a correspondent in Tehran. Most Western outlets obtained information from networks of contacts, human rights groups, and social media content. According to BBC News, an Iranian government disinformation campaign produced social media videos and fake interviews, and attempted to trick Western media into reporting falsehoods: "They can then say foreign media is reporting fake news".

According to France 24, protests "had dwindled" across most of the country by March 2023.

Actions by protesters 
Protesters often stage small and quick, but numerous, "flash mob" gatherings. Drivers have blocked streets with their cars to slow down security forces; roads have also been blocked by dumpster bins or even overturned police cars. Security forces on motorbikes cut through traffic, with passengers firing on protesters. In some cases security forces used paintballs to mark demonstrators; some demonstrators packed extra clothes to replace painted clothes, wore masks to avoid identification, or dismantled public security cameras. Some protesters chanted from windows or rooftops. Symbolic protests include dyeing fountains blood-red, and women discarding and burning their hijabs or cutting their hair in public. Since turbans are viewed as a symbol of the regime, some activists engaged in turban throwing (knocking the turbans off of "privileged" Iranian clerics on the street and running away); reformers such as Ahmad Zaidabadi criticized the trend, and said the practice can harass uninvolved scholars.

Civil boycotts 
Some university teachers and professors declared their support for the student movement by boycotting classes or resigning. They included Nasrollah Hekmat (Shahid Beheshti University), Ammar Ashoori (Islamic Azad University), Lili Galehdaran (Shiraz Art University) and Gholamreza Shahbazi (Art and Soureh Universities), together with Alireza Bahraini, Shahram Khazaei, and Azin Movahed (Sharif University of Technology, Tehran).

On December 5 to 7, 2022, a general strike took place to put pressure on the regime.

Slogans 
Demonstrators used slogans and banners that directly criticized the government of the Islamic Republic of Iran and Khamenei. Protesters showed strong opposition to human rights violations perpetrated by Iran's Guidance Patrol. "Woman, Life, Freedom" is the signature slogan of the protests.

Casualties 

On 20 September 2022, Esmail Zarei Kousha, governor of the northwestern Kurdistan province, confirmed the first three deaths in the protests, and stated that they were not killed by security forces. As of 26 September, a count of official statements by authorities tallied at least 13 dead, while state-controlled television news suggested that at least 41 had been killed, including protesters and police. On 3 December, the government stated that 200 were killed—a figure still significantly lower than that provided by the United Nations and human rights groups. According to Iran Human Rights, as of 27 January 2023, at least 488 people had been killed, including women and at least 64 children. Death certificates obtained by the organization confirm that many died from live bullets. The Oslo-based human rights organization however stated that with the current Internet blackouts, it was difficult to get accurate and up-to-date figures. According to Human Rights Activists in Iran, as of 22December, 506 protesters including 69 minors have been killed. In addition to Amini herself, the death of several women protesters were widely reported by the media, including Nika Shakarami, Hadis Najafi and Sarina Esmailzadeh. According to the families of deceased protesters, Iranian authorities have covered up killings of protesters by pressuring the families of victims, and by fabricating reports of suicides or car accidents.

By 25 September 2022, five Basij members had been killed by protesters. By 26 October 2022, when an IRGC officer was killed in Malayer, 33 security force members had been killed. By 6 January 2023, 68 security force members had been killed.

Iran's security forces in tandem with state media have falsely tried to claim that several killed protesters were actually loyalist Basij militiamen killed by the "rioters", and have put pressure on their families with death threats if they do not cooperate.

Arrests and death sentences 

Hundreds of women have been detained and abused by the authorities. The authorities used torture and ill-treatment to obtain false confessions from protesters who had been arrested. , over a thousand people have been arrested, according to Iranian state news. According to the Committee to Protect Journalists, at least forty journalists have been detained. Anonymous sources cited by CBS News have stated that many protesters decline to seek medical assistance due to a reasonable fear of imprisonment.

It was reported on 1 November that Iran had charged about a thousand people in Tehran for their alleged involvement in the protests and was holding public trials against the accused. However, reporting from the state aligned news agency ISNA claimed that only 315 people were indicted in Tehran with more than 700 others indicted in other provinces. An informal network of activists inside Iran, labeled the Volunteer Committee for Monitoring the Situation of Detainees has alleged that as of 30 October intelligence agencies reported the arrest of 130 human rights defenders, 38 women's rights advocates, 36 political activists, 19 lawyers and 38 journalists along with citizen protesters. An additional count of 308 university students and 44 minors that had been arrested by Iranian forces was also released by the organization.

In November 2022, a Revolutionary Court in Tehran issued its first death sentence to one of the protesters on the charge of moharebeh ("enmity against God"), "corruption on Earth" and "setting fire to a government centre, disturbing public order and collusion for committing crimes against national security". Canadian Prime Minister Justin Trudeau tweeted false information that the Iranian state had imposed the death penalty on nearly 15,000 protesters; the tweet was taken down eleven hours later. On 23 November, Farideh Moradkhani, niece of Iran’s Supreme Leader, Ayatollah Ali Khamenei was arrested in Tehran after calling on foreign governments to cut ties with Iran following the government's protest crackdowns.

Executions 
The first execution of the Mahsa Amini protests was on 8 December 2022, when Iran executed 23-year-old Mohsen Shekari, accused of blocking a road and using a machete to wound a police officer, on charges of moharebeh. Iran Human Rights director Mahmood Amiry-Moghaddam called Shekari's trial a "show trial without any due process". On 12 December 2022, Iran publicly hanged a second protester, Majidreza Rahnavard. Iran continued with executions into the new year after two more men, Mohammad Mehdi Karami and Seyyed Mohammad Hosseini, were hanged on 7 January 2023, in connection with the alleged killing of a Basij paramilitary member during the protests.

2022 University food poisoning 
More than 1,200 Iranian university students at six universities were reportedly poisoned with vomiting, hallucinations, and severe body aches before they were due to attend anti-regime protests across the country. Videos posted online showed students dumping their canteen food onto the streets in protest. The Iranian science ministry blamed the illnesses on food poisoning, but the student union claimed that past experiences at Isfahan university and the sudden lack of electrolytes at university clinics suggested that the regime was deliberately trying to thwart the protests. Iranians called for a three-day period of national strikes and protests to begin on 7 December.

Suspected schoolgirl poisonings 

Starting in November 2022 and over the course of months, thousands of schoolgirls were hospitalized under circumstances that some attributed to a sequence of mass poisoning attacks, with some eyewitnesses reporting signs of toxic gas attack. Some critics claimed the poisonings might have been by pro-regime actors in retaliation for the role young women played in the protests against the mandatory hijab. International scientists stated an independent investigation would be required, including access to hospital test results and interviews with patients; otherwise it could be difficult to draw any firm conclusions about whether some or all of the incidents were real poisonings, or whether the entire epidemic could instead be attributed to mass psychogenic illness. The Guardian and others criticized Iran for its slow, opaque, and contradictory responses to the epidemic.

Response by Iranian government 

The government seeks to prevent the protesters from coordinating and from coming together under a unified leadership. Because, historically, some professional militaries have disobeyed orders to attack their own people (for example, during the 1991 Soviet coup attempt and the Iranian Revolution itself), Iran prefers to rely on the Basij to enforce domestic order against protesters. With technological support from China and Russia, Iran maintains the capability to shut down Internet and cellphone services. If protesters bring phones and neglect to disable tracking, the government attempts to track and identify protesters through the phones' GPS. Iran allegedly utilizes ambulances as covert transport to move security forces and kidnap protesters. CNN interviews have charged Iran with tactics such as forced confessions, threats to uninvolved family members, and torture, including electric shocks, controlled drowning, and mock execution. According to testimony and social media videos, Iranian authorities engage in sexual violence against protesters. A CNN investigation was able to corroborate several such accounts, including the case of a political dissident being brutally raped in custody.

Communications blackouts 

Beginning on 19 September, the Iranian government has blocked access to specific Internet services and repeatedly shut down the Internet and cellphone partly and networks entirely, in order to prevent images and video of the protests from reaching a worldwide audience, and to hinder protesters from organizing effectively. According to Internet monitoring group NetBlocks, these are "the most severe Internet restrictions since the November 2019 massacre", when during the 2019–2020 protests the Internet was completely shut down for a week, and 1,500 protesters were killed by government forces. Outages during the current protests have been shorter and less widespread than the 2019 blackout, and are highly disruptive, but widely circumvented. Iranians have been hopping between services depending on what currently works.

Despite the nationwide Internet blackouts, some videos of the events were distributed internationally. A small group of people from both inside and outside of Iran run the 1500tasvir Instagram account, which, had over 450,000 followers. The group stated that on typical days they received more than 1,000 videos and published dozens. They posted video to their Twitter accounts. One member of the 1500tasvir team described the impact of Internet shutdowns as "extraordinary", and negatively impacting protests, saying that "When you [can] ... see other people feel the same way, you get more brave" but "When the Internet is cut off ... you feel alone". IranWire and Radio Zamaneh, exiled journalistic outlets, collect information from Iran and have had drastically increased Iranian online audiences since the protests began; they also broadcast by satellite.

Prior to the protests, access to the Internet was already heavily restricted, in what NetBlocks calls a "filternet". Over five million websites were blocked. Many Internet domains were blocked. Social media were especially restricted: Facebook, Telegram, TikTok, and Twitter were all previously blocked after the 2009 post-election protests. These blocks are not entirely effective; Twitter is still widely used by Iranians, and Telegram is also used. Instagram and WhatsApp had been allowed and were popular in Iran (reportedly, 2 million Iranian businesses were on Instagram, and 70% of Iranian adults used Whatsapp), and early in the protests, they were only blocked regionally, being blocked only in Saqqez and Sanandaj for a few days beginning on the 19th of September. Beginning on 21 September, Instagram and WhatsApp were also blocked nationwide. Iranian state media has said the imposed restrictions are due to "national security" concerns. The blocking of Whatsapp was fairly effective, but Instagram remained very widely used despite the block. As of 24 September, access to Skype has reportedly been blocked. As of 29 September, the Apple App Store, the Google Play Store, and LinkedIn have also been blocked.

Many Iranians have used VPNs to bypass Internet filtering, hopping  from one to another as they are blocked. VPNs are illegal in Iran, so providers act as a mafia with government connections. VPN service has been progressively downgraded. Tor Browser is also used. Psiphon is popular.

It has also been reported that text messages are being filtered, and communications which mention Amini's name are blocked from delivery to the intended recipient. People began using end-to-end-encrypted instant messaging clients instead. WhatsApp stated that they are working to keep Iranian users connected and would not block Iranian phone numbers; it has successfully been blocked for much of the protests. Telegram is widely used, especially by activists and journalists, as is Signal. Signal asked the tech community and international volunteers to run proxy servers (to circumvent blocks on the Signal servers). Signal also published support documents in Persian. However, Signal has been hampered by Iranian blocking of SMS validation text codes that Signal attempts to send to its users.

In addition to selectively blocking websites, the entire network has repeatedly been shut down and cut off from the world outside Iran. This is expensive; the cost was estimated at $37 million US a day. Multiple monitoring groups have documented rolling connectivity blackouts, affecting Iran's largest mobile carriers, with a "curfew-style pattern of disruptions" that lasts for 12 hours at a time. Internet speeds have also been throttled at times when people are on the streets, probably to prevent them from uploading videos. With the spread of demonstrations to over 80 cities across the country, the government repeatedly shut down mobile networks. As the protests wore on, increasingly only the 4G cellphone masts covering the areas of the protests were shut down, so that mobile data was not available to protesters.

Satellite and direct peer-to-peer communications bypass blocked wire, fiber, and cellphone network hardware entirely. Satellite news broadcasts, such as London-based Farsi-language Iran International, provided updates on planned demonstrations. Jamming by the Iranian government was partially successful in blocking foreign satellite TV in parts of Iran. On 7 October, Eutelsat accused Iran of jamming two Persian-language broadcast satellites, in contravention of ITU rules. Toosheh is a satelltite data broadcast which uses satellite TV receiving equipment common in Iran. It can be used to download files, which are then sometimes sneakernetted, but it cannot be used to upload content. Starlink satellite uplinks require  ground stations, and a large clear space to place the antenna in, which makes them hard to import and hide. They are also difficult to set up.

Iranians use mesh networks, including mobile ad-hoc networks, in which consumer computers and cellphones transmit data between one another directly (by radio: Wi-Fi and Bluetooth). However, the physical devices have to be close enough (within ~) to relay the data from one to another, so this is not useful for talking to the world outside Iran. Some activists distributed paper leaflets detailing planned protests.

Policy reforms suggestions
In early December 2022, a statement by the attorney general suggested that the hijab law was under review and that the Guidance Patrol might be disbanded.

Facial recognition
In potentially the first usage of facial recognition technology to enforce religious dress codes, some women involved in the protests have received hijab violation citations in the mail without any prior interaction with law enforcement officers. Iranian authorities may have trialed the technology as early as 2020, when women were sent warnings through SMS text if they were not wearing a hijab within motor vehicles.

Analysis
In October 2022, several intellectuals disagreed on whether the protests already constituted a revolution; several described conditions in which the protest could become a revolution.

Author Maral Karimi stated that the protests "definitely [had] the potential" to become a revolution, but that "theoretically, we can never say if it's a revolution until it's concluded". Karim Sadjadpour of the Carnegie Endowment for International Peace judged it impossible to predict whether there would be sufficient "divisions at the top" for the protests to become a "full-scale" revolution. Political scientist Janice Stein stated that "where revolutions succeed" would be whether security forces would be willing to fire on citizens.

Author Dina Nayeri stated that "Iranian women aren't looking for hijab reform or concessions on gender laws. They're leading a revolution. The people of Iran don't want to live under Sharia or any religious law." Chess arbiter Shohreh Bayat stated that the protests had evolved into a revolution, "fighting for freedom and for women's and human rights".

In research published in Journal of International Affairs in 2020, prior to the 2022 protests, Saeed Ghasseminejad and colleagues argued that in 2017, protests in Iran had switched from reform to revolution, in the sense of aiming to overthrow the Islamic Republic. They argued that five factors: "geography, demography, violence levels, organization/cohesion, and slogans of protests" provided evidence for a switch. In October 2022, Southern Cross University lecturer Nasim Salehi argued that women had been actively organising a "quiet revolution" since the 1979 Iranian Revolution, being "courageous and bold" in the July 1999 student protests against the closure of the newspaper Salam, the 2009 presidential election protests, the 2017–2018 protests against governmental economic policies, and the 2019–2020 Bloody Aban protests against fuel price increases. Salehi described the protests as "evolution toward revolution", where evolution is seen as "small yet strong and consistent change". Her research group had earlier found that young Iranian women saw themselves as agents of social change.

By early November, the protests were seen by The Guardian as the greatest challenge to the Iranian government since the 1979 revolution. Unlike the 2019–2020 protests, the Mahsa Amini protests spread nationwide, across social classes, universities, the streets and schools.

As of November 2022, the protest movement did not have a centralized leadership.

On 23 December 2022, Parisa Hafezi, writing in Reuters, described the events as the "worst legitimacy crisis since the 1979 Islamic Revolution [for] Iran's religious leaders". The BBC called the protests "the longest running anti-government protests in Iran since the 1979 Islamic revolution."

Reactions 

According to the BBC, as of November 2022, Western grassroots public opinion is strongly on the side of the protesters. For Western governments, the protests compete for priority with other issues such as Iranian nuclearization and Iranian arms shipments to Russia. Many international NGOs have explicitly condemned Iran's government for the violent crackdown, but the United Nations has declined to follow suit, instead limiting itself to statements of concern.

On 22 September, CNN's chief international anchor Christiane Amanpour was scheduled to interview President Raisi in New York City, following his appearance at the United Nations general assembly. Amanpour planned to speak with Raisi about several international issues, including Amini's death and the ensuing protests. The interview would have been the first time Raisi spoke with US media on American soil. Forty minutes after the interview was set to begin and before Raisi arrived, an aide to the Iranian leader made a last-minute request and stated that the meeting would not happen unless Amanpour wore a headscarf, referring to "the situation in Iran" and calling it "a matter of respect". Amanpour responded that she could not agree to the "unprecedented and unexpected condition" and later reflected on the situation, saying that when conducting interviews outside of Iran, "I have never been asked by any Iranian president ... to wear a head scarf".

Several Iranian women living in India demonstrated against the Iranian government and burned their hijabs as a sign of protests.

President Ebrahim Raisi stated that "Enemies want to create a new sedition by riding the wave of livelihood and economic demands of the people; But people are alert and will not allow abuse while raising their demands."

On 24 September, the Foreign Ministry of Iran summoned the ambassadors of the UK and Norway, over of what it considered their "interventionist stance". In particular, the Iranian authorities protested the "hostility" allegedly created by Farsi-language London-based media outlets, as well as the statements made by Iranian-born president of the Norwegian parliament Masud Gharahkhani, in support of the protests.

Iran has alleged that Kurdish groups in Iraq have supported the protests, and has launched attacks on Iraq's Kurdistan region. A 28 September drone and missile attack on an Iranian-Kurdish opposition group in Iraq killed at least 14, including an American and her newborn. The U.S. condemned the attack and threatened further sanctions against Iran. As of 5 October 2022, Iranian attacks (mainly artillery strikes) on Kurdish Iraq were still continuing.

On 3 October, Khamenei commented for the first time on Amini's death and said that "[her] death deeply broke my heart" and called it a "bitter incident", while giving his full support to security forces against protesters. Khamenei dismissed the widespread unrest as "riots" caused by foreign states and dissidents abroad.

On 10 October, Iranian foreign ministry spokesperson Nasser Kanaani called on foreigners to "respect our laws" and noted that Iran had arrested 9 citizens of the European Union for supporting the protests.

On 2 November, Khamenei described the events of the past few weeks as "an hybrid war" and said that "the young people who came to the streets are our own children".

In Europe and North America, thousands of protesters demonstrated in solidarity with Iranian protesters.

International organizations 
  European Union: The European External Action Service (EEAS) condemned Amini's death in a statement and called for the Iranian government to "ensure that fundamental rights of its citizens are respected". On 4 October, EU foreign policy chief Josep Borrell said the EU was considering sanctions against Iran. By 7 October, Denmark, France, Germany, and Italy had called for EU sanctions against Iran.
  United Nations: UN Secretary-General António Guterres, on 27 September, issued a statement calling on Iranian security forces to "refrain from using unnecessary or disproportionate force". Nada al-Nashif, the acting UN High Commissioner for Human Rights, expressed concern over Amini's death and Iranian authorities' response to the resulting protests. Ravina Shamdasani, the spokesperson for the UN High Commission for Human Rights, urged Iran's clerical leadership several days later to "fully respect the rights to freedom of opinion, expression, peaceful assembly, and association". Shamdasani added that reports specify that "hundreds have also been arrested, including human rights defenders, lawyers, civil society activists, and at least 18 journalists", and "Thousands have joined anti-government demonstrations throughout the country over the past 11 days. Security forces have responded at times with live ammunition". On 22 November the Office of the High Commissioner for Human Rights stated that more than 300 people including 40 minors have been killed so far by the Iranian government since the start of the protests; throughout the country and in 25 out of 31 of its provinces.

Human rights advocates 
After photos and videos of the protests and the responding force shown during the protests, many international human rights groups such as the Iran Human Rights group and the Human Rights Watch group, and the UN Acting High Commissioner for Human Rights Nada al-Nashif, issued statements of concern. The Human Rights Watch group raised specific concerns about reports that seem to indicate authorities using teargas and lethal force to disperse protesters. In early November 2022, Human Rights Watch issued a further statement claiming that Iranian authorities had intensified their attacks on dissent and the widespread protects through "dubious national security charges" against arrested protesters and "grossly unfair" trials.

Amnesty International has stated "The Iranian authorities have repeatedly shown utter disregard for the sanctity of human life and will stop at nothing to preserve power" and has called on UN member states to "urgently establish an independent investigative and accountability mechanism for the most serious crimes under international law committed in Iran".

Sanctions 

On 22 September, the United States Department of the Treasury announced sanctions against the Morality Police as well as seven senior leaders of Iran's various security organizations, "for violence against protesters and the death of Mahsa Amini". These include Mohammad Rostami Cheshmeh Gachi, chief of Iran's Morality Police, and Kioumars Heydari, commander of the Iranian army's ground force, in addition to the Iranian Minister of Intelligence Esmaeil Khatib, Haj Ahmad Mirzaei, head of the Tehran division of the Morality Police, Salar Abnoush, deputy commander of the Basij militia, and two law enforcement commanders, Manouchehr Amanollahi and Qasem Rezaei of the Law Enforcement Command of Islamic Republic of Iran in Chaharmahal and Bakhtiari province. The sanctions would involve blocking any properties or interests in property within the jurisdiction of the U.S., and reporting them to the U.S. Treasury. Penalties would be imposed on any parties that facilitate transactions or services to the sanctioned entities. On 6 October, the U.S. sanctioned seven Iranian government officials involved with the protest crackdowns.

On 26 September, Canadian Prime Minister Justin Trudeau stated that his government would impose sanctions on the Morality Police, its leadership, and the officials responsible for Amini's death and the crackdown on the protesters. On 3 October, the sanctions became official when Foreign Affairs Minister Mélanie Joly announced sanctions targeting 9 entities, including the Morality Police and the Iranian Ministry of Intelligence and Security, and 25 individuals, that include high-ranking officials and members of the IRGC. These individuals include Mohammed-Hossein Bagheri, chief of staff of Iran's armed forces, IRGC Commander-in-Chief Major General Hossein Salami, and Esmail Qaani, commander of the Quds Force of the IRGC. On 7 October, the Canadian government expanded the sanctions, banning 10,000 members of the IRGC from entering the country permanently, which represents the top 50% of the organization's leadership. The Prime Minister, Justin Trudeau, stated that Canada planned to expand the sanctions against those most responsible for Iran's "egregious behavior". Canadian Deputy Prime Minister, Chrystia Freeland, stated that Iran was a "state sponsor of terror", and that "it is oppressive, theocratic and misogynist; The IRGC leadership are terrorists, the IRGC is a terrorist organization".

On 10 October, the United Kingdom applied sanctions on Iranian officials with Foreign Secretary James Cleverly stating that the United Kingdom meant to "send a clear message to the Iranian authorities — we will hold you to account for your repression of women and girls, and for the shocking violence you have inflicted on your own people." Also on 10 October, Deutsche Welle reported that the European Union was working behind the scenes to prepare a sanctions package against Iran. The German foreign minister Annalena Baerbock promised that the EU would issue travel bans and asset freezing against Iranian officials trying to suppress the protests. Bijan Djir-Sarai, spokesperson of the German Free Democratic Party, urged the organization to "quickly adopt powerful sanctions that target the Iranian oligarchy", including members of Iran's Morality Police, Iran's Revolutionary Guard Corps and other loyalists of the Islamic regime, "who are responsible for serious human rights violations".

On 13 October, Canada imposed new sanctions on Iran's government entities and seventeen government-affiliated figures, stating "the actions of the Iranian regime speak for themselves – the world has watched for years as it has pursued its agenda of violence, fear and propaganda" (...) Canada will continue to defend human rights and we will continue to stand in solidarity with the Iranian people, including women and youth, who are courageously demanding a future where their human rights will be fully respected." The figures listed include former foreign minister Javad Zarif, army general Amir Hatami, and Saeed Mortazavi, an Iranian prosecutor whom Canada holds accountable for the torture (and in turn, death) of Canadian-Iranian journalist Zahra Kazemi.

On 17 October, the EU sanctioned eleven individuals and four entities in Iran, including the Basij and the morality police.

The Guardian (on 18 October) characterized Western sanctions as "largely symbolic".

On 12 December, the New Zealand Government imposed travel bans on 22 members of the Iranian security forces connected to Mahsa Amini's death and the suppression of the protests. Individuals affected by the ban have included Iranian Revolutionary Guard Corps Commander-in-Chief Hossein Salami, Basij Commander Gholam-Reza Soleimani, Law Enforcement Command chief commander Hossein Ashtari, and Guidance Patrol Commander Mohammed Rostami.

In popular culture

Music 

On 28 September, Shervin Hajipour released the song "Baraye" as a music video which went viral online on multiple platforms, and was viewed by millions of people. Hajipour was arrested days later on October 4, and then released on bail after he deleted the original video. Several media outlets have called it "the anthem of the protests". Shahin Najafi released the song "Hashtadia" ("The Eighties' [Children]", i.e. the young people born in the 1380s H.S. / the year 2002 onwards), and other Iranians who have published protest songs include Hichkas (the "father of Iranian rap"), Toomaj Salehi (arrested), and Kurdish rapper Saman Yasin (arrested, sentenced to execution).

Sports 
Following the arrest of retired captain Hossein Mahini, some members of Persepolis F.C. reportedly wore black armbands at a match, and were later summoned by security, according to Iran International. In October 2022, fans of Borussia Dortmund unveiled banners in support of Sarina Esmailzadeh and the women of Iran. During the November 2022 Beach Soccer Intercontinental Cup, members of the Iranian beach soccer team were filmed not singing along to the national anthem. Player Saeed Piramoon imitated cutting his hair to show support for the protests and calling for greater freedoms for Iranian women during celebrations for scoring the winning goal. During the December 2022 Wrestling World Cup in Iowa, Iranian fans continued their protests against the Iranian government, despite event organizers banning all flags, signs and banners.

During the 2022 IFSC Climbing Asian Championships held in Seoul in mid-October, Iranian climber Elnaz Rekabi received international attention for competing without a hijab. She returned to Tehran. She was greeted as heroine by a cheering crowd at Tehran airport, arriving with a baseball cap and hoodie. Rekabi stated that the act was not intended to be symbolic, claiming publicly that she had been in a hurry and that her headscarf had fallen off accidentally. Human rights organisations and activists suggested that Rekabi had been coerced by the Iranian authorities. , Rekabi was under house arrest according to BBC News and France 24, while Iranian authorities stated that Rekabi was at her home because she was "in need of rest".

Handball player Sajjad Esteki, women's rugby captain Fereshteh Sarani, fencer Mojtaba Abedini Shourmasti and taekwondo artist Mahsa Sadeghi have all quit their respective national teams in protest, with Olympic wrestler Rasoul Khadem stating his support.

2022 FIFA World Cup 

The Iranian football team wore black jackets without logos during their 27 September World Cup preparation friendly against Senegal; their team uniforms underneath with their team logos were not visible. Given that some team members had tweeted solidarity with the protesters, the jackets were widely interpreted as a further showing of solidarity with the protesters.

During the first match of the Iranian soccer team for the 2022 FIFA World Cup against England on 21 November, the team appeared to engage in silent protest in solidarity with the protesters by refusing to sing their national anthem as is customary before each match. Video footage seemed to show some Iranian fans booing the anthem as it played, with some Iranian supporters cheering against their own team or boycotting their team amidst the ongoing protests as they felt the team was representing the government. Before the match, the team captain Ehsan Hajsafi and the midfielder Saman Ghoddos both offered words of support to the protesters and the movement.

Iran's national team had been put under high pressure to support the protesters and had been criticised for not doing enough. Some fans accused the team of siding with the government’s crackdown against protesters. The team's coach, Carlos Queiroz, had been angered over what the players had been experiencing behind the scenes, saying they even have received threats. He asked to "let the kids play the game", and told the Iranian fans after the England game to "stay at home" if they can't support the team.

In the following match against Wales, the Iranian players were filmed singing the national anthem, amidst the boos and whistles from the Iranian supporters. Some protesters had their pre-revolutionary Lion and Sun flags and Women, Life, Freedom banners snatched from them by pro-government fans and stadium security at the Ahmad bin Ali Stadium. Protesters were harassed by government supporters with some protesters being detained by Qatari police, while stadium security confirmed they were given orders to confiscate anything but the flag of the Islamic Republic of Iran. Documents obtained by Iran International showed Iran was coordinating secret efforts with Qatar to control who attends the World Cup and restrict any signs of dissent.

Prior to Iran's final group stage match against the United States, Iran's state-run media called for the U.S. team to be expelled from the tournament after the U.S. Soccer Federation removed the Islamic Republic emblem from Iran's flag in a social media post. The U.S. Federation confirmed it had done so to show support for Iranian protesters before deleting the post.

On 28 November, ahead of Iran's match against the United States, the Iranian players were reportedly called in to a meeting with members of the IRGC and were threatened with violence and torture for their families if they did not sing the national anthem or joined the protests against the Iranian regime. On 24 November, however, prior to the match against Wales, Mehdi Taremi denied they had come under pressure from their government after their anthem protest in the England match. On 28 November, Iran's judiciary announced it has released more than 700 prisoners following the victory over Wales.

Before the match against the United States, the Iranian players sang the national anthem again before losing to the United States 1–0 and thereby being knocked out of the tournament. Many Iranians celebrated the defeat; in Bandar-e Anzali, a motorist, Mehran Samak, was reportedly shot dead by security forces after he honked his horn to celebrate Iran's exit from the tournament. Many Iranians refused to support the national team at the World Cup, seeing it as an extension of the government.

See also 

 Homa Darabi
 Human rights in the Islamic Republic of Iran
 International Women's Day Protests in Tehran, 1979
 Iranian Revolution
 Killing of Neda Agha-Soltan
 List of protests in the 21st century
 My Stealthy Freedom
 2022 Zahedan massacre

Notes

References

External links
 No room for compromise? Iran general strike called as hopes for concessions fade (video), 5 December 2022, France 24.
 Iran's protest generation on why they won't be silenced (podcast), 8 November 2022, The Guardian.
 Hashtags, a viral song and memes empower Iran's protesters, 1 November 2022, BBC.
 Persistent protests put survival of Iran's theocratic regime in question by Alex Whiteman, 19 October 2022, Arab News.
 Iran protests spread worldwide (video), 24 September 2022, DW.

 
2022 protests
2023 protests
Iranian protests against compulsory hijab
Protests in Iran
September 2022 events in Iran
October 2022 events in Iran
November 2022 events in Iran
December 2022 events in Iran
January 2023 events in Iran
Presidency of Ebrahim Raisi
Guidance Patrol